The number of Belarusians in Serbia is around 5,501 people, as stated by the Ministry of Internal Affairs of Serbia, between February 24 and November 2, 2022. Most of these Belarusians do not have Serbian citizenship, and have arrived during the Russian invasion of Ukraine.

These numbers include all temporary passing residence and registered emigrants, including statistics from required registration after 30 days of visa free residence. Because of this, actual number of residence with Belarusian citizenship is smaller from the statistical numbers given my the Ministry of Internal Affairs.

Notable people
 Ljiljana Raičević, Serbian activist of Belarusian descent.
 Sergei Gurenko, Belarusian football coach and former player, assistant in Serbian national football team between 2016 and 2017.

See also

Belarus-Serbia relations
Serbs in Belarus

References

Belarus–Serbia relations
Ethnic groups in Serbia
Serbia